The 2022–23 Bahraini King's Cup is the 21st season of the Bahraini King's Cup, the national football cup competition of Bahrain since it was renamed as the King's Cup in 2003 (named Emir Cup or Federation Cup before).

First preliminary round

Second preliminary round

Round of 16

Quarter-finals

Semi-finals

Final

References

External links
Soccerway

Bahraini King's Cup seasons
King's Cup
Bahrain